"Whirlyball 7"" is a split EP released in May 2007, featuring songs from four bands from Atlanta, Georgia. The record was released by Chunklet magazine and served as a ticket to a concert featuring Deerhunter, The Selmanaires, Carbonas and The Coathangers. The record was only available at Atlanta's Criminal Records record store. The concert took place on June 1, 2007 at Roswell, Georgia. After the show, due to popular demand, the EP was available to purchase online, but only 100 copies on black vinyl and 100 on clear vinyl were available. There was a brief repress where some number of blue colored vinyl was pressed.

Track listing

Side A - "Side Whirly"
"Blue Ruse" - The Selmanaires
"Kousin Klash" - Deerhunter

Side B - "Side Ball"
"Look Around (I Was So Upset)" - Carbonas (originally by Hubble Bubble)
"Nestle In My Boobies" - The Coathangers

Personnel
The Selmanaires
Herb Harris - guitar, vocals, percussion, drums
Jason Harris - drums, vocals, wurlitzer electric piano, sampler, stand-up bass, percussion
Tommy Chung - bass, vocals, guitar, percussion, stand-up bass
Mathis Hunter - percussions, guitar, sampler, drums

Deerhunter
Bradford Cox - vocals
Moses Archuleta - drums
Justin Bosworth - bass
Colin Mee - guitar

Carbonas
Greg King - vocals
Dave Rahn - drums
Jesse Smith - bass
Josh Martin - lead guitar
Clay Kilborne - rhythm guitar

The Coathangers
The Crook Kid Coathanger - vocals, guitar, tambourine
Minnie Coathanger - vocals, bass, tambourine
Rusty Coathanger - vocals, drums
Bebe Coathaner - vocals, keys

References

2007 EPs
Split EPs